Love Language is the eighth album by R&B/Soul crooner Teddy Pendergrass. It was his first record for Asylum Records after being a longtime artist on Philadelphia International Records. It did much better on the Billboard 200 than his last two records, peaking at #38. He had not reached the top 40 on the album charts since 1981's It's Time for Love.  The album was composed and produced by Michael Masser, with the exception of the track You're My Choice Tonight (Choose Me) (#15 R&B chart, November 3, 1984), which was produced by Luther Vandross and featured Cissy Houston on background vocals and as "Solo Female Voice".

Hold Me (#46 Hot 100, July 28, 1984; #6 Adult Contemporary Chart) written by Masser and Linda Creed was a duet with Whitney Houston (it later turned up on Houston's debut album).  As a result of having recorded this duet in 1984, Houston was disqualified from consideration as Grammy Best New Artist of 1985.

The track "In My Time" reached number 11 on the South African charts, spending seven weeks in the top 20.

Songs from the album were used on the soundtrack to Alan Rudolph's 1984 film Choose Me. In her review of the film, critic Pauline Kael stated: "The songs are performed by Teddy Pendergrass and he's just right. The entire movie has a lilting, loose, choreographic flow to it."

Track listing
"In My Time" (Michael Masser, Cynthia Weil) – 3:48
"So Sad The Song" (Gerry Goffin, Masser) – 3:23
"Hot Love" (Linda Creed, Masser, Ray Parker Jr.) – 4:43
"Stay With Me" (Goffin, Masser) – 4:19
"Hold Me" (Duet with Whitney Houston) (Creed, Masser) – 5:59
"You're My Choice Tonight (Choose Me)" (Marcus Miller, Luther Vandross) – 4:48
"Love" (Randy Goodrum, Masser) – 4:28
"This Time is Ours" (Goffin, Masser) – 3:22

Personnel and production

Tracks 1-5, 7 & 8 arranged and produced by Michael Masser for Prince Street Productions, Inc.  Strings and horns arranged by Gene Page.  Recording engineers: Michael Mancini, Dean Burt, Guy Charbonneau, Cliff Bonnell.  Mixed by Guy Charbonneau; remix by Bill Schnee Mastering Engineer: Doug Sax Drums: Carlos Vega; Bass: Nathan East; Keyboards: Randy Kerber, Michael Masser, Ray Parker Jr. (also played guitars on "Hot Love"); Guitars: Paul Jackson Jr.
Track 6 arranged and produced by Luther Vandross for Vandross Ltd.  Rhythm Arrangements: Marcus Miller.  Strings and horns arranged by Nat Adderley Jr.  Recording engineers: Ray Bardani, Michael Barbiero, Doug Epstein, Michael Brauer, Guy Charbonneau.  Drums: Yogi Horton; Percussion: Steve Kroon, Errol "Crusher" Bennett; Bass/Synthesizer: Marcus Miller; Keyboards: Nat Adderley Jr.; Guitars: Doc Powell; Background Vocals: Cissy Houston

References 

1984 albums
Teddy Pendergrass albums
Asylum Records albums
Albums arranged by Gene Page
Albums produced by Michael Masser